Reginald Weldon Garrett (born November 21, 1951) is a former professional American football player who played wide receiver for three seasons in the National Football League (NFL) for the Pittsburgh Steelers. He is currently the safety and security manager at U.S. Foods in Perth Amboy, New Jersey.

Early life
Reggie Garrett was born in Silsbee, Texas and attended Waldo Mathew High School (now Silsbee High School). He studied at New Mexico Highlands University and graduated from Eastern Michigan University.

References

1951 births
Living people
People from Silsbee, Texas
American football wide receivers
Eastern Michigan Eagles football players
Pittsburgh Steelers players
New Mexico Highlands Cowboys football players